Robert Cloutman Dexter (1887 – 1955) was the founder of the Unitarian Service Committee (progenitor of the Unitarian Universalist Service Committee), which worked during World War II to rescue and assist Jewish refugees and other victims of Nazism in Europe.

Early life
Robert Dexter was born on October 1, 1887 in Shelburne, Nova Scotia of an American mother and a Canadian father, who was a sea captain.  Robert grew up in Boston and graduated from Brown University in 1912 with a B.A. and later acquired an M.A. from Brown.  Over the next years he served as a social worker for a number of small organizations and with the entry of the United States into World War I he worked for the American Red Cross, supervising camps for soldiers in the South East. In 1915, he married Elisabeth Anthony, and they both studied for doctorates at Clark University, he in sociology and Elisabeth in history.  They both taught at Skidmore College from 1923 to 1927, and moved to Cambridge Massachusetts in 1927 when Robert Dexter accepted a position as head of the Departments of Social and International Relations for the American Unitarian Association, a job that entailed many visits to liberal religious congregations in Europe.

World War II
In 1937 and 1938, Dr. Dexter visited Czechoslovakia, and the congregation in Prague led by Norbert Capek, which at that time was the largest Unitarian congregation in the world. The Unitarians and the Dexters also had strong ties to the Masaryk family. During this period, Dexter wrote detailed reports on the plight of refugees in the Sudetenland. He began a letter campaign to find Americans to write affidavits for Jewish refugees who hoped to emigrate, and he published articles praising the skills of European refugees and calling for less restrictive immigration policies. He began to raise funds for a new organization to help endangered refugees in Czechoslovakia and found support among prominent members of First Church of Belmont Massachusetts.  The Unitarians recruited a young Unitarian minister Waitstill Sharp, and his wife, Martha, to go to Czechoslovakia in early 1939 for an extended period of time.  Martha Sharp and Waitstill remained in the country after the Germans occupied Czechoslovakia, and they were effective in their programs for relief and emigration. The success of the Sharps’ activities increased momentum for the founding of the Unitarian Service Committee, which was officially launched in the Spring of 1940, for the purpose of helping endangered refugees. Robert Dexter became executive director of the organization, which set up an office in neutral Lisbon in the Spring of 1940. In 1941, he worked for six months in the Lisbon office of the committee, along with Elisabeth Anthony Dexter and continued the collaboration with Varian Fry and with the American Jewish Joint Distribution Committee that had begun under the Sharps and their replacement Charles Joy.

In 1942, Robert Dexter was recruited by the Office of Strategic Services and given the code name “Corn.”  He set up links between the OSS and colleagues of Varian Fry in Marseille who were active in the French Resistance. Dexter also recruited the director of the Unitarian Service Committee’s medical program in Vichy France, Rene Zimmer. These ties facilitated a program in refugee assistance with ties to the French underground. In 1944, Robert Dexter became the representative of the U.S. War Refugee Board in Portugal. At the end of 1944, Robert Dexter resigned from the Unitarian Service Committee (now the Unitarian Universalist Service Committee) and completed his position with the WRB. Robert Dexter retired a few years later from his work at the Church Peace Union, during a serious illness, and died in 1955 of unknown causes following an extended period of depression.

Honours and awards

Foreign honours
 : Officer of the Order of the White Lion (1946)

Bibliography
 Lewis Anthony Dexter, A Memoir of Elisabeth Anthony Dexter, Social Background and Personal Meaning of a Type of Feminist Research, 17 pp. , unpublished essay, in possession of the author, cited by Subak (2010), p. 275.
  
 Robert Dexter (undated, est. 1938) "Confidential Report, Czechoslovakian Mission," Robert Cloutman Dexter archives, Hay Library, Brown University. Box 14, Folder 3. as cited by Subak (2010), p. 242. See also .
 
 Robert C. Dexter Profile.  Office of War Information, August 21, 1944. Robert Cloutman Dexter archive, Hay Library, Brown University. See .

Notes and references

1887 births
American humanitarians
Brown University alumni
Clark University alumni
1955 deaths
Officers of the Order of the White Lion